Frederick Douglass and the White Negro is a documentary telling the story of ex-slave, abolitionist, writer and politician Frederick Douglass and his escape to Ireland from America in the 1840s.

Synopsis
The film follows Douglass's life from slavery as a young man through to his time in Ireland, where he befriended Daniel O'Connell, toured the country spreading the message of abolition and was treated as a human being for the first time by white people. His arrival in Ireland coincided with the Great Famine, and he witnessed white people in what he considered to be a worse state than his fellow Black Americans back in the US. The film follows Douglass back to America, where he buys his freedom with funds raised in Ireland and Britain. Fellow passengers on his return journey include the Irish escaping the famine who arrived in their millions and would go on to play a major role in the New York Draft Riot of 1863, which Douglass could only despair over. The film examines (with contributions from the author of How The Irish Became White Noel Ignatiev amongst others) the turbulent relationship between African Americans and Irish Americans during the American Civil War, what drew them together and what drove them apart and how this would shape the America of the twentieth century and beyond.

See also
List of films featuring slavery
12 Years a Slave

References

External links
 Frederick Douglass and the White Negro  official site
 

1845 in Ireland
2008 documentary films
2008 films
African Americans in the American Civil War
Cultural depictions of Frederick Douglass
Documentary films about African Americans
Documentary films about slavery
Documentary films about slavery in the United States
Irish documentary films
Films about activists
Films about famine
Films about race and ethnicity
Films set in New York City
Films set in the 1840s
Films set in the 1860s
Films set in the 19th century
Massachusetts in the American Civil War
Documentary films about the American Civil War
English-language Irish films
Irish-American mass media
Irish diaspora
Irish-language films
Films set in the Victorian era
War films based on actual events
Works about the Great Famine (Ireland)
2000s English-language films
2000s American films